The Scout and Guide movement in Benin is served by two organisations
 Guides du Bénin, member of the World Association of Girl Guides and Girl Scouts
 Scoutisme Béninois, member of the World Organization of the Scout Movement

See also